Raymond E. Cleary III (born August 13, 1948) is a former Republican member of the South Carolina Senate, who represented the 34th District from 2004 until 2017.

External links
South Carolina Legislature - Raymond E. Cleary III official SC Senate website
Project Vote Smart - Senator Raymond E. 'Ray' Cleary (SC) profile
Follow the Money - Raymond E Cleary III
2006 2004 campaign contributions

1948 births
Living people
People from Lincoln County, North Carolina
Methodists from South Carolina
Republican Party South Carolina state senators
21st-century American politicians